The 1946 Eastern Kentucky Maroons football team was an American football team that represented Eastern Kentucky State College (now known as Eastern Kentucky University) as a member of the Kentucky Intercollegiate Athletic Conference (KIAC) during the 1946 college football season. In their tenth and final season under head coach Rome Rankin, the Maroons compiled a 5–4 record (3–1 against KIAC opponents), won the KIAC championship, and outscored opponents by a total of 112 to 88.

Schedule

References

Eastern Kentucky
Eastern Kentucky Colonels football seasons
Eastern Kentucky Maroons football